The following is a list of squads for each nation who competed at the 2017 FIFA Confederations Cup in Russia from 17 June to 2 July 2017, as a prelude to the 2018 FIFA World Cup. Each squad consisted of 23 players, three of which had to be goalkeepers. Replacement of injured players was permitted until 24 hours before the team's first game.

The age listed for each player is on 17 June 2017, the first day of the tournament. The number of caps listed for each player does not include any matches played after the start of the tournament. The club listed is the club for which the player last played a competitive match prior to the tournament. The nationality for each club reflects the national association (not the league) to which the club is affiliated.

Group A

Mexico
Manager:  Juan Carlos Osorio

Jesús Corona withdrew from the squad due to injury and was replaced by Jürgen Damm.

New Zealand
Manager:  Anthony Hudson

Portugal
Manager: Fernando Santos

Russia
Manager: Stanislav Cherchesov

Group B

Australia
Manager: Ange Postecoglou

Brad Smith and Mile Jedinak withdrew from the squad due to injury and were replaced by Alex Gersbach and James Jeggo, respectively.

Cameroon
Manager:  Hugo Broos

Chile
Manager:  Juan Antonio Pizzi

Germany
Manager: Joachim Löw

Leroy Sané and Diego Demme withdrew from the squad due to injury and were not replaced, thus reducing the squad to 21 players.

Player representation

By age

Players
Oldest:  Rafael Márquez
Youngest:  Dane Ingham

Goalkeepers
Oldest:  Jhonny Herrera
Youngest:  André Onana

Captains
Oldest:  Rafael Márquez
Youngest:  Julian Draxler

By club

By club nationality

Nations in italics are not represented by their national teams in the finals.

By representatives of domestic league

References

External links
 FIFA Confederations Cup Russia 2017 at FIFA.com

FIFA Confederations Cup squads
Squads